Edge of Existence may refer to:

 Edge of Existence, a 2019 album by Silvertomb
 EDGE of Existence programme, a research and conservation initiative